Phaeoramularia indica is a species of sac fungus. The fungus was found to cause leaf spots in north-eastern Uttar Pradesh.

References 

Phaeoramularia
Fungal plant pathogens and diseases
Leaf diseases
Fungi of India